Male Pčelice (Serbian Cyrillic: Мале Пчелице) is an urban neighborhood of Kragujevac. It is located in Kragujevac's municipality of Stanovo.

Location and Divisions
Male Pčelice (Novo Naselje and Staro Selo) is one of the most populous single neighborhoods of Kragujevac. In general, Male Pčelice is bordered by the Korićani and Drača to the west, Veliko Polje to the south and Stanovo to the east.

History
Until the 1990s, Male Pčelice was a suburb of Kragujevac, a separate, extremely fast growing town (population 1948: 683; 1953: 668; 1961: 720; 1971: 2,274; 1981: 5,006 ), so it was administratively annexed to the Kragujevac City proper, becoming local community within the city, connected Male Pčelice and the rest of Kragujevac into one continuous built-up area. In 2005 local community of Male Pčelice had a population of 6,333, which was 20% of the population in the urban section of the Stanovo municipality. Male Pčelice is mostly residential area.

Kragujevac neighborhoods